Audrey Esparza (born March 4, 1986) is an American actress best known for her role as FBI agent Tasha Zapata on the American television series Blindspot, and more recently as Liliana on Power and its spin-off, Power Book IV: Force.

Early life 
Esparza trained at the Experimental Theatre Wing at the Tisch School of the Arts at New York University.
She's the daughter of pediatric dentist Felipe Esparza and Sandra Puig Esparza and has two sisters, Amanda (older) and Alyssa (younger).

Career 
Esparza's film credits include: Family Practice, Amateurs, The Americans, Blue Bloods, Golden Boy, Floating Sunflowers, Power, Black Box, Madam Secretary, Public Morals, and her main character as Tasha Zapata, an FBI agent on Blindspot.

Filmography

References

External links
 

Living people
1986 births
People from Laredo, Texas
American television actresses
Hispanic and Latino American actresses
Tisch School of the Arts alumni